Protea aurea subsp. potbergensis, also known as the Potberg protea, or Potberg sugarbush, is a flowering plant of the genus Protea. It is endemic to South Africa and is found only in the Potberg near Cape Infanta. It grows to a height of 5 metres, and flowers primarily from May to June.

The plant dies after fire, but the seeds survive, and are spread by the wind. The plant is single-sexed. Pollination takes place through the activity of birds. The plant grows in sandy soils at elevations of 200 - 360m.

The plant's national number is 90.6.

Gallery

See also
 List of Southern African indigenous trees and woody lianes
 List of Protea species

References

Trees of Africa
IUCN Red List near threatened species
aurea subsp. potbergensis